Life and Work is the editorially independent monthly magazine of the Church of Scotland. It was founded in 1879 by Archibald Hamilton Charteris. The first issue was published in January 1880 under the editorship of Rev Archibald Clerk from Lorn.

It incorporated the Mission Record of the Church of Scotland from 1900, and at the 1929 union of the Church, it merged with United Free Church's The Record as Life and Work: The Record of the Church of Scotland.

Life and Work was an initiative of the Church's Committee of Christian Life and Work, which was led by Charteris, a professor of biblical criticism at Edinburgh University who was also founder of the Woman's Guild. 
  
Life and Work has a 4-page Gaelic supplement, Na Duilleagan Gàidhlig, established in 1880, which is included on request, and is also available online.

The current editor is Lynne McNeil.

In January 2006 the magazine reverted to its older title Life and Work, instead of Life & Work.

In April 2013 a Life and Work website was launched, including extracts from the magazine as well as additional news and features.

List of editors
1879: Archibald Hamilton Charteris
1880–98: Rev John McMurtrie 
1898–1902: Rev Archibald Fleming
1902–25: Rev Robert Howie Fisher
1925–30: Rev Harry Smith
1929–34: William Pringle Livingstone
1935–45: Rev George Carstairs
1945–65: Rev John Wright Stevenson
1965–72: Rev Leonard John Armstrong Bell
1972–91: Robert Deans Kernohan
1991–94: Peter B. Macdonald 
1994–99: Dr Robin Hill (later Reverend)
2000–02: Rosemary Goring 
since 2002: Lynne McNeil

See also
Church of Scotland Yearbook

References and further reading

 R D Kernohan, Scotland's Life and Work, St. Andrew Press, Edinburgh, 1979. 
Life and Work website
Life and Work at the Church of Scotland website

1879 establishments in Scotland
Presbyterian newspapers and magazines
Church of Scotland
Magazines established in 1879
Mass media in Edinburgh
Scottish Gaelic mass media
Magazines published in Scotland
Religious magazines published in the United Kingdom
Religion in Scotland